KSCO (1080 kHz) is a commercial AM radio station broadcasting a talk radio format. The station is owned by Zwerling Broadcasting and is licensed to Santa Cruz, California. The radio studios and offices are on Portola Drive in Santa Cruz. The station can be heard over much of Central California during the day.

By day, KSCO broadcasts at 10,000 watts non-directional. Because 1080 AM is a clear channel frequency reserved for KRLD Dallas and WTIC Hartford, at sunset, to avoid interference, KSCO reduces power to 5,000 watts and uses a directional antenna.  KSCO also has three translator stations to broadcast its programming on the FM dial.

History
KSCO signed on the air on September 21, 1947.  It originally was powered at 1,000 watts by day and 500 watts at night and was housed in a distinctive art deco building, which was constructed for the station, and still broadcasts there today. The founder was Charles Vernon Berlin, who also served as General Manager and Chief Engineer. In 1962, he added 99.1 KSCO-FM (now KSQL).

In 1986, Berlin sold KSCO-AM-FM to Fuller-Jeffrey Broadcasting which owned numerous stations around the country. The AM station went to an automated format of adult standards. On March 10, 1987, KSCO-FM changed its call letters to KLRS (Colors) and its format to a new-age music format, the first station in North America to do so, with Mark Hammond as program director and Jay Peterson music director 

Since 1991, KSCO has been owned by the Zwerling family and has a talk radio format format. The Zwerlings later acquired another local AM station, 1340 KOMY. Both Michael and his mother Kay Zwerling took an active role in the station with the former regularly hosting the call-in show Saturday Special and the latter writing and voicing politically conservative commentaries on a variety of topics, especially politics and current events. On January 3, 2017 Kay Zwerling died at 95 years old.

On September 25, 2006, the offices of KSCO and KOMY received an envelope containing white powder. The envelope, which had no return address and contained no letter, was addressed to "AUNTIE KSCO" in handwriting described by Program Director Rosemary Chalmers as "chicken-scratch." Emergency response teams arrived on scene, and all KSCO personnel in the building were evacuated by a HazMat crew. By the evening of Tuesday, September 26, an FBI lab had determined that the powder was inert, and KSCO/KOMY's broadcast studios were deemed safe. Regular broadcasting resumed at 8 p.m. None of the four people who came in contact with the envelope experienced symptoms of any illness. On October 24, 2022, the FCC proposed a $20,000 fine for Zwerling Broadcasting System, because KSCO had been operating outside of its licensed nighttime parameters since late 1996. On December 15, 2022, the FCC denied Zwerling Broadcasting's appeal, and affirmed the $20,000 fine for KSCO.

Programming

The station programming is a mix of local, syndicated and brokered programming (meaning a person can purchase an available hour of time and produce their own show). A host can either pay for the hour out of his or her own pocket or find local businesses to sponsor the show in exchange for advertising.

The programming is a mix of local and national shows. The morning hours feature a locally produced news-and-comment program with Rosemary Chalmers. Local host Charley Freedman hosts middays, followed by afternoon drive time with Dave Michaels. In addition to political commentary, Freedman serves up vintage jazz from the 1920s, '30s, and '40s. The night includes nationally syndicated programs with Alex Jones and Coast to Coast AM with George Noory.

KSCO does not subscribe to rating services, so listenership is unreported. On its webpage, KSCO solicits donations from listeners to keep it on the air. KSCO also sells brokered programming hours to augment advertising income. Paid programing includes Dr. Joel D. Wallach, a veterinarian and self-described naturopath. The commissions that come from the sale of Wallach's products are, by KSCO's own admission, the station's primary revenue stream, and without it, the station would be unprofitable, as the station is unable to support itself through advertising alone.

Ethan Bearman broadcasts his nationally syndicated show from KSCO. Bearman received attention for discussions on his show of needle exchange programs in Santa Cruz. A fill-in host for Bearman also generated controversy when station chief engineer Bill Graff threatened to turn the station off over comments the host made during a segment parodying Duck Dynasty following the controversy surrounding Phil Robertson’s GQ Interview.

Past KSCO's local programs were hosted by Daryl Alan Gault, Rob Roberts and Brian Maloney. Current local hosts include Vernon Bohr (A.K.A. Vernon Vernon Vernon), as well as Rosemary Chalmers (host of KSCO's morning commute show, Good Morning Monterey Bay), with engineer and co-host Rick O'Shea, and local news with Jason Strubbe, Tavia Avila, and Susan Simon.

Translators

On August 3, 2015, KSCO launched an FM simulcast on 104.1 MHz with translator K281CA from the Mt. Madonna Tower. It uses a directional antenna with most of the signal directed to the west.

On May 11, 2017 KSCO was granted a license for translator K300DD on 107.9 MHz from the Mt. Madonna Tower. It uses a directional antenna with most of the signal directed to the north northeast.

On June 8, 2017 KSCO was granted a license for translator K239CN on 95.7 MHz from the Mt. Madonna tower. It uses a directional antenna with most of the signal directed to the east southeast.

References

External links
FCC History Cards for KSCO
KSCO 1080 AM Website

SCO
News and talk radio stations in the United States
Radio stations established in 1947
Conservative talk radio
1947 establishments in California
Santa Cruz, California